Szymany may refer to the following places:
Szymany, Greater Poland Voivodeship (west-central Poland)
Szymany, Gmina Grajewo in Podlaskie Voivodeship (north-east Poland)
Szymany, Gmina Wąsosz in Podlaskie Voivodeship (north-east Poland)
Szymany, Nidzica County in Warmian-Masurian Voivodeship (north Poland) 
Szymany, Szczytno County in Warmian-Masurian Voivodeship (north Poland)

See also
Szczytno-Szymany International Airport